Oostzaan is a municipality and a town in the Zaanstreek, Netherlands, in the province of North Holland.

Oostzaan—together with Westzaan and Assendelft—are considered the "mother towns" of the Zaanstreek (the region around the River Zaan), of which they are the three oldest towns. Oostzaan also played a role in the VOC and WIC shipping and shipbuilding.

In the 17th century Oostzaan had its own pirate, named Claes Compaen. Originally sailing from the Netherlands as a legal pirate captain, in the possession of pirate letters, he soon began to raid ships for his private account, from the English Channel, to the Mediterranean Sea and the African-Atlantic coast into even the Caribbean Sea. He liquidated the booty on the coast of Ireland, later in Salé and the Barbary Coast. A street in Oostzaan is named for Claes Compaen. 

The town has a Reformed church with a cruciform groundplan, the Great Church (1760), which contains two ship models that recall the days when Oostzaan was an important sea-faring community. In the Oostzijderveld area of Oostzaan stands a windmill, De Windjager (The Wind Hunter).

Hamlets 
Oostzaan consists of several hamlets,
 Achterdichting (Get Behind The Seal),
 De Heul,
 Kerkbuurt (church neighborhood),
 Noordeinde (North end),
 Zuideinde (South end).
Kerkbuurt and the northern part of Zuideinde are the center of Oostzaan.

Local government 
The municipal council of Oostzaan consists of 13 seats, which are divided as follows:

Economy
The poultry company Meyn Food Processing Technology is headquartered in Oostzaan.

Notable people 

 Jacob Cornelisz van Oostsanen (before 1470 – 1533) a Northern Netherlandish designer of woodcuts and a painter
 Claes Gerritszoon Compaen (1587 in Oostzaan - 1660 in Oostzaan) a Dutch corsair, merchant, a privateer for the Dutch Republic and pirate
 Albert Heijn (1865 in Oostzaan – 1945) a Dutch entrepreneur who founded Albert Heijn, a Dutch supermarket chain
 Grietje de Jongh (1924 in Oostzaan – 2002) a Dutch sprinter, competed at the 1948 and 1952 Summer Olympics
 Robert Tijdeman (born 1943 in Oostzaan) a Dutch mathematician, specializing in number theory, wrote Tijdeman's theorem
 Trijnie Rep (born 1950 in Oostzaan) a Dutch former speed skater, who competed at the 1972 Winter Olympics
 Charles Zwolsman Sr. (1955 in Oostzaan – 2011) a Dutch drug dealer and professional racecar driver

Gallery

References

External links 

 

 
Municipalities of North Holland
Populated places in North Holland